Abeid is both a surname and a given name. Notable people with the name include:

Aly Abeid (born 1997), Mauritanian footballer
Bahati Ali Abeid (born 1967), Tanzanian politician
Mehdi Abeid (born 1992), Algerian footballer
Abeid Karume (1905–1972), President of Zanzibar